The Goulding Baronetcy, of Millicent in Clane in the County of Kildare and Roebuck Hill in Dundrum in the County of Dublin, is a title in the Baronetage of the United Kingdom. It was created on 22 August 1904 for the businessman William Goulding, a prominent freemason who was director several railway companies in Ireland, and son of William Goulding (1817–1884), the last Conservative MP for Cork City. He accompanied the Church of Ireland Archbishop of Dublin John Gregg and Bishop of Cashel Robert Miller "to see Michael Collins in May 1922, following the murders of thirteen Protestants in the Bandon valley, to ask whether the Protestant minority should stay on. Collins 'assured them that the government would maintain civil and religious liberty'."

The third Baronet was a successful cricketer and the husband of Valerie Goulding. As of 2007 the presumed fourth Baronet has not successfully proven his succession and is therefore not on the Official Roll of the Baronetage, with the baronetcy considered dormant.

The family surname is pronounced "Goolding".

Goulding baronets, of Millicent and Roebuck Hill (1904)
Sir William Joshua Goulding, 1st Baronet (1856–1925)
Sir William Lingard Amphlett Goulding, 2nd Baronet (1883–1935)
Sir (William) Basil Goulding, 3rd Baronet (1909–1982)
(William) Lingard Walter Goulding, presumed 4th Baronet (born 1940)

Goulding Baronet of Wargrave Hall (1915)
Sir Edward Alfred Goulding, 1st and last Baronet (1862–1936) - Made Baron Wargrave, 1922.

Notes

References 
Kidd, Charles, Williamson, David (editors). Debrett's Peerage and Baronetage (1990 edition). New York: St Martin's Press, 1990, 

Goulding
Extinct baronetcies in the Baronetage of the United Kingdom